Consata is a town in a region of western Bolivia known for its abundance of gold, especially in the Consata River.

References 

Populated places in La Paz Department (Bolivia)